Pleasant Valley High School may refer to:

 Pleasant Valley High School (Alabama), Jacksonville, Alabama
 Pleasant Valley High School (California), Chico, California
 Pleasant Valley High School (Iowa), Riverdale, Iowa, near Bettendorf
 Pleasant Valley High School (Pennsylvania), Brodheadsville, Pennsylvania